Al-Jalil Club is a football club based in Irbid, Jordan, which competes in the Jordan League. This club is formed by a Palestinian refugee camp in Irbid called Irbid camp, Al-Jalil named after an Galilee region in Palestine.

Honors
Jordan FA Shield
Winners (1): 2021

Current squad

Current technical staff

Managerial history
  Jabbar Hamid
  Abdel-Naser Makees
 Hussein Alwaneh
  Jabbar Hamid (2021–present)

Kit providers
Adidas F50

External links

Football clubs in Jordan
Sport in Irbid
1953 establishments in Jordan